Kavunji (Mannavanur Panchayat) is a Panchayat village of terrace farmers at the far western end of the Western Ghats in Kodaikanal block of Dindigul district, Tamil Nadu state, South India, Pincode 624103. Kavunji is notable as a vegetable farming area.

History
There is a Tamil language inscription on a stone in the street believed to be dated in S.S. 1013 (CE 1091). The people of Kavunji believe that the inscription relates details and results of a controversy. The inscription measures .

Agriculture
Kavunji will soon become a corporate village, due to introduction of a mega cluster project bringing  of irrigated, rain fed and wasteland under cultivation at an estimated cost of Rs.77.7 million. 1,497 farmers will benefit.

This cluster will produce potato, carrot, peas and beans in large scale adopting the latest techniques such as special precision farming, uniform cropping pattern and drip fertigation system.

The Department of Horticulture will do field preparation, install drip fertigation system, develop community nursery and supply inputs for cultivation of vegetables. The Agro Engineering Department will create water structures, including 19 ground-level reservoirs to store water drawn from pipes from the Konalaru river and provide pumping facility to irrigate the entire project area.

BalaCares Foundation Donated Drinking Water facilities to this village on 1999 with individual pipe connection for each and every street in kavunji village.

Health
The Sri Bala Medical Centre is a non-profit private hospital in Kavunji that concentrates on preventive medicine, maternal and child healthcare of the upper and lower hills villages poor people. It is supported by the Bala Care Foundation started in December 1998.

Education
There is a Primary School,  Panchayat Union Middle School and Government High School in Kavunji.
Now kavunji also having higher secondary.

Notes

External links
This is not an original Kavunji photo.
 Photograph of the village

Villages in Dindigul district